Sciomyzoidea is a superfamily of Acalyptratae flies.

The families placed here include at least the following:
 Coelopidae – seaweed flies
 Dryomyzidae
 Helcomyzidae
 Helosciomyzidae
 Heterocheilidae
 Huttoninidae
 Natalimyzidae
 Phaeomyiidae
 Ropalomeridae
 Sciomyzidae – marsh flies, snail-killing flies (including Huttoninidae, Phaeomyiidae, Tetanoceridae)
 Sepsidae – scavenger flies

References

External links

 
Diptera superfamilies
Taxa named by Carl Fredrik Fallén